John Grosskopf is an American academic administrator. Since 2009, Grosskopf has served as president of North Florida College (formerly North Florida Community College).

Biography 
Grosskopf graduated with his bachelor's degree in English from Florida International University. He received his master's degree and did Doctoral course work in English at Florida State University.

Prior to becoming president of North Florida College, he served as the college's vice president of academic affairs and chief academic officer. As president of North Florida College, he has worked with the Madison County Chamber of Commerce to help students find jobs.

See also
 North Florida College
 Florida Community Colleges System

References

External links
 Announced as President of NFCC

Living people
American educators
Florida State University alumni
Florida International University alumni
Year of birth missing (living people)